Ingarikó (Ingaricó) or Kapon is a term that collectively refers to three closely related tribes of indigenous people of South America, living in areas of Venezuela, Brazil and Guyana. Linguistically, the three groups fall within the Cariban language family. These groups are:
The Akawaio people
The Pemon people
The Patamona people

See also
Annetta Kapon, artist 
Tomer Kapon (born 1985), Israeli film and television actor